KHTK (1140 AM) is a commercial radio station licensed to Sacramento, California. KHTK broadcasts a sports radio format as "Sactown Sports 1140" and is an affiliate of the CBS Sports Radio network.  It is owned by Salt Lake City–based Bonneville International, a profit-making subsidiary of the Church of Jesus Christ of Latter-day Saints.  The studios and offices are on Commerce Circle in North Sacramento, just north of the American River.

KHTK is powered at 50,000 watts, the maximum for commercial AM radio stations.  Because AM 1140 is a clear channel frequency reserved for Class A XEMR in Monterrey, Mexico, and WRVA in Richmond, Virginia, KHTK must broadcast with a directional antenna at all times to avoid interference, using a five-tower array.  The transmitter is on Rising Road in Wilton, California.

KHTK is the second Sacramento AM station, after KIID, to broadcast using the HD Radio hybrid format.  The signal is audible as far north as Redding, as far south as Monterey and into the suburbs of San Francisco.  It is also simulcast on the third HD subchannel of sister station KNCI.

Programming lineup
Weekdays begin with "The Carmichael Dave Show with Jason Ross" in morning drive time.  In middays, two CBS Sports Radio nationally syndicated shows are heard: Los Angeles-based "The Jim Rome Show" followed by The Herd with Colin Cowherd. KHTK has a local afternoon drive show featuring Nick Cattles along with Ramie Makhlouf.  At night and weekends, when there is no live game scheduled, KHTK carries CBS Sports Radio shows.

KHTK serves as flagship station for Sacramento Kings NBA basketball (whose team colors are the same as the station’s logos) and UC Davis Aggies football.  Also heard are Oakland Athletics baseball, Las Vegas Raiders football and San Jose Sharks hockey.

History

Early years
KHTK first signed on the air on November 12, 1926.  It carried the call sign KGDM.  The station was originally owned by Hercules Broadcasting, licensed to Stockton, California, and operating at 1130 kHz with 1,000 watts of power.  Initially it was a daytimer, required to go off the air from sunset to sunrise.  

The 1941 North American Regional Broadcasting Agreement required the station to move its frequency.  KGDM switched to 1140 kHz with 5,000 watts, now authorized to broadcast full-time. In 1957, the station changed calletters to KRAK, increased power to 50,000 watts and flipped to a Top 40 format. The station unsuccessfully competed with KSTN-1420 which at that time only ran on 1000 watts. KSTN would continue with Top 40 (later called CHR) until 1999 though by the late 1980's had a Rhythmic/Urban slant to the format.

Country KRAK
KRAK flipped to a country music format in 1962. The station had changed its city of license to Sacramento and moved to new facilities. Some of the early personalities included "Oakie Paul" Westmoreland, Walt Shaw, and Dick Bains.  With country music moving more into mainstream popularity during the 1970s, KRAK became one of the Sacramento area's most popular stations.   Listeners were not only exposed to artists such as Johnny Cash, Dolly Parton, Waylon Jennings, and Willie Nelson, but enjoyed two decades of on-air personality stability.   Joey Mitchell hosted the morning show, and was named "Sacramento Radio Personality of the Year" several times.   Rick Stewart hosted middays, Big Jim Hall hosted afternoon drive, Hal Murray hosted nights, and Fred Hoffman hosted "Captain Fred's All-Night Truckin' Show.   All had Top 40 backgrounds which led to a tighter, more upbeat format.

KRAK continued to broadcast into the 1990s, long after other music stations had switched to the FM band.  KRAK-FM would eventually move ahead in the ratings, later becoming KNCI through changes after a purchase by CBS Radio and frequency switching.

Talk and Sports
On February 28, 1994, KRAK became KHTK, a Hot Talk station, as "Hot Talk 1140."  After a couple of years in the talk format, it flipped to its current all-sports format.   The call letters "KRAK" would make a brief return in the Sacramento media market as a classic country station at AM 1470 before that station was sold to Radio Disney and is today KIID, airing programming in Punjabi.  Most recently, the KRAK call letters were assigned to the now-KMPS in Victor Valley, California, also owned by CBS and airing the CBS Sports Radio Network.

KHTK was originally branded as "Sports 1140" before adopting "The Fan" branding in November 2011. On January 1, 2013, KHTK began to identify itself as "CBS Sports 1140." On July 1, 2013, six months after identifying as "CBS Sports 1140," KHTK switched its branding back to "KHTK Sports 1140", then to "Sports 1140 KHTK". One of KHTK's initial sports hosts was Pro Football Hall of Famer Jack Youngblood, who co-hosted with Mike Remy, the station's former program director.

Ownership changes
On July 31, 2008, the CBS Corporation announced that KHTK and its five sister stations in Sacramento were being put up for sale as part of the planned divestiture of radio stations outside the top-15 U.S. radio markets. KHTK would remain part of the CBS Radio family for nearly a decade.

On February 2, 2017, CBS Radio announced it would merge with Entercom which locally owned KKDO, KUDL, KSEG, KRXQ, and KIFM. 
The company formerly owned KDND until it shut the station down and turned in its license to the Federal Communications Commission two days later. On October 10, CBS Radio announced that as part of the process of obtaining regulatory approval of the merger, KHTK would be one of sixteen stations that would be divested by Entercom, along with sister stations KYMX, KZZO, and KNCI; KSFM would be retained by Entercom. 

On November 1, Entercom announced that Bonneville International would begin operating KHTK, KYMX, KZZO and KNCI via a local marketing agreement (LMA) when the merger of CBS and Entercom closed on November 17, while their licenses were placed into a divestiture trust pending a sale to a different owner within 180 days. On August 3, 2018, Bonneville announced it would buy the stations outright in a $141 million deal.  The sale was completed on September 21, 2018.

Controversy 
Former KHTK afternoon host and Kings play-by-play announcer Grant Napear was a staple of the station's programming from 1997 until 2020. In June 2020, Bonneville fired Napear for insensitive remarks towards former Kings player DeMarcus Cousins in a series of Twitter feeds regarding the Black Lives Matter movement.

Sactown Sports
On June 20, 2022, KHTK rebranded as "Sactown Sports 1140".

Previous logo

References

External links
 
 

1926 establishments in California
Bonneville International
CBS Sports Radio stations
Radio stations established in 1926
HTK
Sports in Sacramento, California
Sports radio stations in the United States
UC Davis Aggies football